Acrasis rosea is a species of heterolobosean, previously described as a slime mold.

References

Further reading 
 
 

Percolozoa